The first ascent of the Matterhorn was a mountaineering expedition made by Edward Whymper, Lord Francis Douglas, Charles Hudson, Douglas Hadow, Michel Croz, and two Zermatt guides, Peter Taugwalder and his son of the same name, on 14 July 1865. Douglas, Hudson, Hadow and Croz were killed on the descent when Hadow slipped and pulled the other three with him down the north face. Whymper and the Taugwalder guides, who survived, were later accused of having cut the rope below to ensure that they were not dragged down with the others, but the subsequent inquiry found no evidence of this and they were acquitted.

The ascent followed a long series of usually separate attempts by Edward Whymper and Jean-Antoine Carrel to reach the summit. Carrel's group had been 200 m below the summit on the Italian side when Croz and Whymper summited. The climbers from Valtournenche withdrew deflated, but three days later Carrel and Jean-Baptiste Bich reached the summit without incident. The Matterhorn was the last great Alpine peak to be climbed and its first ascent marked the end of the golden age of alpinism.

Background and preparations

In the summer of 1860, Edward Whymper,  an athletic, twenty-year-old British artist, visited the Alps for the first time. He had been hired by a London publisher to make sketches and engravings of the scenic mountains along the border of Switzerland and Italy. He was soon interested in mountaineering and decided to attempt the yet unconquered Matterhorn. Whymper soon found that Jean-Antoine Carrel, an Italian guide from the Valtournanche, had attempted to be the first to reach the summit of the Matterhorn since 1857. In the years 1861–1865 both made several attempts by the south-west ridge together but became progressively rivals, according to Whymper because Carrel patriotically believed that a native Italian like himself and not an Englishman like Whymper should be the first to set foot on the summit.

In 1865, Whymper, weary of the defeats he had sustained on the south-west ridge, tried a new way. The stratification of the rocks on the east face seemed to him favourable, and the slope not excessive. His plan of attack was complicated: a huge rock couloir, the base of which lies on the Italian side below the Breuiljoch, on the little Matterhorn glacier, would be ascended to a point high up on the Furggen ridge; from there, traversing the east face of the mountain, he meant to reach the Hörnli (north-east) ridge and follow it to the summit. However, when this route was attempted, the mountain discharged an avalanche of stone upon the climbers, and the ascent failed. His guides refused to make any further attempts by this route.

In the meantime Carrel had spoken with Whymper and had engaged himself for an attempt on the Swiss side. Carrel was engaged to the Englishman until Tuesday, the 11th, inclusive, if the weather were fine; but the weather turned bad and he was thus free. On the morning of the 9th, Whymper, as he was descending to Valtournanche, was surprised to meet Carrel with a traveler, who was coming up with a great deal of baggage. He questioned Carrel, who told him that he would be unable to serve him after the 11th, because he had an engagement with a "family of distinction"; and when Whymper reproached him for not having told him so before, he replied that the engagement dated from a long time back, and till then the day had not been fixed.  Whymper had as yet no suspicion that the "distinguished family" was Felice Giordano but he became aware of it in Breuil on the morning of the 11th, when the guides had already started to explore, and he learnt that everything had been made ready long before for the expedition which was to prepare the way for Quintino Sella.

Giordano wrote to Sella:

Having rolled up his tent and packed his luggage, Whymper wished to hasten to Zermatt to attempt to reach the summit from that side, but he could find no porters. A young fellow Briton arrived with a guide. Whymper made himself known to him, and learnt that he was Lord Francis Douglas, who had lately ascended the Ober Gabelhorn; he told him the whole story, and confided his plans to him. Douglas, declaring himself in his turn most anxious to ascend the Matterhorn, agreed to give him his porter, and on the morning of the 12th they started together for the Theodul pass. They descended to Zermatt, sought and engaged Peter Taugwalder, and gave him permission to choose another guide. When they returned to the Monte Rosa Hotel, they encountered Michel Croz who had been hired by Charles Hudson. They had come to Zermatt with the same intention, to attempt to ascend the Matterhorn. Hudson and his friend Douglas Hadow decided to join Whymper and Douglas and that same evening everything was settled; they were to start immediately, the very next day.

Ascent

The party started from Zermatt on 13 July at half-past five. The eight members included Peter Taugwalder and his two sons, Peter and Joseph, who were acting as porters. At 8:20 they reached the chapel at Schwarzsee, where they picked up some material that was left there. They continued along the ridge and at half past eleven they reached the base of the peak. Then they left the ridge and proceeded for half an hour on the east face. Before twelve o'clock they had found a good position for the tent, and at a height of 3,380 metres they set the bivouac. Meanwhile, Croz and young Peter Taugwalder went on to explore the route, in order to save time on the following day. They turned back before 3p.m., reporting that that ridge offered no great difficulties.

On the morning of the 14th, they assembled together outside the tent and started directly at dawn. Young Peter Taugwalder came on with them as a guide, and his brother, Joseph, returned to Zermatt. They followed the route which had been explored on the previous day, and in a few minutes came in view of the east face:

They went up unroped and, at 6:20, reached a height of 12,800 feet. After a half-hour break they proceeded until 9:55, when they stopped for fifty minutes at a height of 14,000 feet. They had arrived at the foot of the much steeper upper peak that lies above the shoulder. Because it was too steep and difficult they had to leave the ridge for the north face. At this point of the ascent Whymper wrote that the less experienced Hadow "required continual assistance". Having overcome these difficulties the group finally arrived near the summit. When they saw that only two hundred feet of easy snow remained, Croz and Whymper detached themselves and reached the top first.

After having checked that no foot traces were present on the other extremity of the summit, that might have been reached by the Italian expedition, Whymper, peering over the cliff, saw Carrel and party at a great distance below. They were precisely at this moment 200 metres below, still ascending and dealing with the most difficult parts of the ridge. Whymper and Croz yelled and poured stones down the cliffs to attract their attention. When seeing his rival on the summit, Carrel and party gave up on their attempt and went back to Breuil. A note appears in Felice Giordano's diary, in which, dated 14 July, is the following note : "... At 2p.m. they saw Whymper and six others on the top; this froze them, as it were, and they all turned and descended. ..." He wrote a letter to his friend Quintino Sella:

Descent

Whymper and party stayed an hour on the summit. Then they began their descent. Croz descended first, then Hadow, Hudson and Douglas, Taugwalder senior, Whymper with Taugwalder junior coming last. They climbed down with great care, only one man moving at a time. When they were barely an hour from the summit and were all on the rope, Hadow slipped and fell on Croz, who was in front of him. Croz, who was unprepared, was unable to withstand the shock; they both fell and pulled down Hudson and Douglas. On hearing Croz's shout, Whymper and Taugwalder clasped the rocks; they stood firm but the rope broke. Whymper saw them slide down the slope, trying with convulsive hands to stop themselves, and then falling from rock to rock and finally disappearing over the edge of the precipice.

In a letter to The Times, Whymper wrote:

After they could fix some rope on firm rocks and secure themselves they were able to proceed and continue the descent. They finally reached a safer place on the ridge towards 6:00p.m. They looked for traces of their companions and cried to them but in vain. After having seen a curious weather phenomenon in the form of an arch and two crosses (later determined as a fog bow by Whymper), they continued the descent and found a resting place at 9:30p.m. They could resume the descent at daybreak and reach Zermatt on the morning of Saturday, 15 July.

Rescue

On Saturday, a group of people from Zermatt had started to ascend the Hohlicht heights, above the Zmutt valley, which commanded the plateau of the Matterhorn Glacier. They returned after six hours, and reported that they had seen the bodies lying motionless on the snow. They proposed that the rescuers should leave on Sunday evening, so as to arrive upon the plateau at daybreak on Monday. Whymper and J. M'Cormick decided to start on Sunday morning. The guides of Zermatt, threatened with excommunication by their priests if they failed to attend the early mass, were not willing to go. Other people came to help: J. Robertson, J. Phillpotts and another Briton offered themselves and their guides, Josef Marie Alexander Lochmatter, and Franz Andenmatten. Other guides (Frederic Payot and Jean Tairraz) also volunteered.

At 8:30, after having passed the seracs of the Matterhorn Glacier, Whymper and other reached the top of the plateau. Shortly after they discovered the bodies of Croz, Hadow and Hudson. Of Douglas only a sleeve was discovered.
The bodies were recovered later on Wednesday 19 July after an order of the administration. This task was done by 21 men from Zermatt. Croz, Hadow and Hudson were buried on either side of the Zermatt Church. The body of Douglas was not found. 

After the accident John Tyndall conceived a complicated device, involving an enormous length of rope for trying to recover the body of Douglas, but it was never used.

Accident controversy
Shortly after the accident Whymper asked Taugwalder to see the rope and to his surprise he saw that it was the oldest and weakest of the ropes they brought and it was only intended as a reserve. All those who had fallen had been tied with a Manila rope, or with a second and equally strong one, and consequently it had been only between the survivors and those who had fallen where the weaker rope had been used. Whymper also had suggested to Hudson that they should have attached a rope to the rocks on the most difficult place, and held it as they descended, as an additional protection. Hudson approved the idea, but it was never done.

Whymper had then to answer grave charges of responsibility and the accusation of having betrayed his companions. An inquiry, presided by Joseph Clemenz, was instituted by the government of the canton of Valais. The guide Peter Taugwalder was charged, tried, and acquitted. Not withstanding the result of the inquiry, some guides and climbers at Zermatt and elsewhere persisted in asserting that he cut the rope between him and Lord Francis Douglas to save his life.

The accident was long discussed in the media, in Switzerland and abroad. Newspapers all over the world reported the tragedy and no other Alpine event had to that date ever caused more headlines. The emotions were hottest in the United Kingdom of Great Britain and Ireland, where the grief soon gave way to indignation. Queen Victoria considered banning climbing to all British subjects but decided, after consultation, not to forbid mountaineering.

Whymper wrote at the time to the Secretary of the I.A.C. His letter ends thus:

Museum
In the Matterhorn Museum – Zermatlantis the broken piece of rope from the first ascent is kept in a glass cabinet.

Commemoration in 2015
In the week of 14 July 2015, the 150th anniversary of the first ascent, was commemorated including a ceremony with cleric Revd. Alan Purser, Seasonal Chaplain of St. Peter's, the English Church in Zermatt. Local authorities on both the Swiss and Italian side prohibited climbing the mountain on the exact date of the anniversary and proclaimed a police enforced "Tag der Stille" (Day of Quietness), in order to prevent accidents by overcrowding and as a sign of respect for the mountain and its more than 500 casualties. 

A performance of the play The Matterhorn Story written by Livia Anne Richard, at the open air theatre near the Riffelberg tramway station on the Gorner Ridge re-enacted events and speculations around the first ascent.

On 17 July 2017, a simultaneous ascent of the mountain from four sides was organized, and a light show marking the itinerary of the first ascent on evenings until the end of September.

Portrayals in film
The 1928 silent German-Swiss film Struggle for the Matterhorn portrays the ascent, and starred Luis Trenker as Jean-Antoine Carrel. In 1938 the film was remade in sound as The Mountain Calls (Der Berg ruft!) with Trenker both directing and starring. A separate British version The Challenge was made, also featuring Trenker, together with Robert Douglas as Whymper.

The 1959 film, Third Man on the Mountain was a fictional account of the ascent.

See also
Second ascent of the Matterhorn

References

External links
 (subtitles in French)

First ascent of the Matterhorn
1865 in Europe
Mountaineering in the Alps
Mountaineering in Switzerland
Accidental deaths in Switzerland
Mountaineering in Italy
Mountaineering expeditions
Mountaineering disasters
History of the Alps
July 1865 events